Canon Medical Systems Corporation is a medical equipment company based in Ōtawara, Tochigi, Japan. Formerly known as Toshiba Medical, a subsidiary of Toshiba, the company was an early pioneer on X-ray tubes in 1914 in Japan.   Canon Medical Systems feature product such as MRI and helical CT. 

The company was acquired by Canon Inc. in 2016.

Canon Medical Systems is, since late 2012, the Official Medical Systems Partner of Manchester United FC as per a multi-million 5-year contract.

Major competitors
Major competitors of CMSC (Canon Medical Systems Corporation) include:

GE Healthcare
Hitachi Medical Systems
Philips Healthcare
Siemens Healthineers

References

Companies based in Tochigi Prefecture
Medical technology companies of Japan
Toshiba
Medical Systems Corporation
2016 mergers and acquisitions